Way Ratai is a district of Pesawaran Regency, Lampung Province, Indonesia. This district was created out of part of the district of Padang Cermin.

See also
 Gunungrejo, Way Ratai, Pesawaran

References